Logical consequence (also entailment) is a fundamental concept in logic which describes the relationship between statements that hold true when one statement logically follows from one or more statements. A valid logical argument is one in which the conclusion is entailed by the premises, because the conclusion is the consequence of the premises. The philosophical analysis of logical consequence involves the questions: In what sense does a conclusion follow from its premises?  and What does it mean for a conclusion to be a consequence of premises?  All of philosophical logic is meant to provide accounts of the nature of logical consequence and the nature of logical truth.

Logical consequence is necessary and formal, by way of examples that explain with formal proof and models of interpretation. A sentence is said to be a logical consequence of a set of sentences, for a given language, if and only if, using only logic (i.e., without regard to any personal interpretations of the sentences) the sentence must be true if every sentence in the set is true.

The Polish logician Alfred Tarski identified three features of an adequate characterization of entailment: (1) The logical consequence relation relies on the logical form of the sentences: (2) The relation is a priori, i.e., it can be determined with or without regard to empirical evidence (sense experience); and (3) The logical consequence relation has a modal component.

Formal accounts 
The most widely prevailing view on how best to account for logical consequence is to appeal to formality. This is to say that whether statements follow from one another logically depends on the structure or logical form of the statements without regard to the contents of that form.

Syntactic accounts of logical consequence rely on schemes using inference rules. For instance, we can express the logical form of a valid argument as:

 All X are Y
 All Y are Z
 Therefore, all X are Z.

This argument is formally valid, because every instance of arguments constructed using this scheme is valid.

This is in contrast to an argument like "Fred is Mike's brother's son. Therefore Fred is Mike's nephew." Since this argument depends on the meanings of the words "brother", "son", and "nephew", the statement "Fred is Mike's nephew" is a so-called material consequence of "Fred is Mike's brother's son", not a formal consequence. A formal consequence must be true in all cases, however this is an incomplete definition of formal consequence, since even the argument "P is Q&apos;s brother's son, therefore P is Q&apos;s nephew" is valid in all cases, but is not a formal argument.

A priori property of logical consequence 

Our knowledge that  is a logical consequence of  cannot be influenced by empirical knowledge. Deductively valid arguments can be known to be so without recourse to experience, so they must be knowable a priori. However, formality alone does not guarantee that logical consequence is not influenced by empirical knowledge. So the a priori property of logical consequence is considered to be independent of formality.

Proofs and models 
The two prevailing techniques for providing accounts of logical consequence involve expressing the concept in terms of proofs and via models. The study of the syntactic consequence (of a logic) is called (its) proof theory whereas the study of (its) semantic consequence is called (its) model theory.

Syntactic consequence 

This is denoted . The turnstile symbol  was originally introduced by Frege in 1879, but its current use only dates back to Rosser and Kleene (1934--1935). 

Syntactic consequence does not depend on any interpretation of the formal system.

Semantic consequence 

This is denoted . Or, in other words, the set of the interpretations that make all members of  true is a subset of the set of the interpretations that make  true.

Modal accounts 

Modal accounts of logical consequence are variations on the following basic idea:

Alternatively (and, most would say, equivalently):

Such accounts are called "modal" because they appeal to the modal notions of logical necessity  and  logical possibility. 'It is necessary that' is often expressed as a universal quantifier over possible worlds, so that the accounts above translate as:

Consider the modal account in terms of the argument given as an example above:

All frogs are green.
Kermit is a frog.
Therefore, Kermit is green.

The conclusion is a logical consequence of the premises because we can't imagine a possible world where (a) all frogs are green; (b) Kermit is a frog; and (c) Kermit is not green.

Modal-formal accounts 

Modal-formal accounts of logical consequence combine the modal and formal accounts above, yielding variations on the following basic idea:

   if and only if it is impossible for an argument with the same logical form as / to have true premises and a false conclusion.

Warrant-based accounts 

The accounts considered above are all "truth-preservational", in that they all assume that the characteristic feature of a good inference is that it never allows one to move from true premises to an untrue conclusion. As an alternative, some have proposed "warrant-preservational" accounts, according to which the characteristic feature of a good inference is that it never allows one to move from justifiably assertible premises to a conclusion that is not justifiably assertible. This is (roughly) the account favored by intuitionists such as Michael Dummett.

Non-monotonic logical consequence 

It is also possible to specify non-monotonic consequence relations to capture the idea that, e.g., 'Tweety can fly' is a logical consequence of

{Birds can typically fly, Tweety is a bird}

but not of

{Birds can typically fly, Tweety is a bird, Tweety is a penguin}.

See also

 Abstract algebraic logic
 Ampheck
 Boolean algebra (logic)
 Boolean domain
 Boolean function
 Boolean logic
 Causality
 Deductive reasoning
 Logic gate
 Logical graph
 Peirce's law
 Probabilistic logic
 Propositional calculus
 Sole sufficient operator
 Strict conditional
 Tautology (logic)
 Tautological consequence
 Therefore sign
 Turnstile (symbol)
 Double turnstile
 Validity

Notes

Resources 
 .
  London: College Publications. Series: Mathematical logic and foundations.
 .
  1st edition, Kluwer Academic Publishers, Norwell, MA. 2nd edition, Dover Publications, Mineola, NY, 2003.
 . Papers include those by Gödel, Church, Rosser, Kleene, and Post.
 .
  in Lou Goble (ed.), The Blackwell Guide to Philosophical Logic.
  in Edward N. Zalta (ed.), The Stanford Encyclopedia of Philosophy.
 .
 .
  365–409.
 
  in Goble, Lou, ed., The Blackwell Guide to Philosophical Logic. Blackwell.
  (1st ed. 1950), (2nd ed. 1959), (3rd ed. 1972), (4th edition, 1982).
 in D. Jacquette, ed., A Companion to Philosophical Logic. Blackwell.
 Reprinted in Tarski, A., 1983. Logic, Semantics, Metamathematics, 2nd ed. Oxford University Press. Originally published in Polish and German.
 
 A paper on 'implication' from math.niu.edu, Implication 
 A definition of 'implicant' AllWords

External links

 
Philosophical logic
Metalogic
Propositional calculus
Deductive reasoning
Concepts in logic
Syntax (logic)
Binary operations